Lubalin is a Canadian singer, musician, and video producer from Montreal, Quebec. He is known for sharing humorous videos on TikTok and his appearances on The Tonight Show Starring Jimmy Fallon and The Kelly Clarkson Show.

Early life 
Lubalin is from Montreal, Quebec.

Musical career 
Lubalin was initially a R&B/pop musician before his production of humorous videos attracted wider attention . 

His 2020 series of videos Internet Drama attracted over 5 million followers and over 200 million views, and got him invited on to The Tonight Show Starring Jimmy Fallon and The Kelly Clarkson Show. Lubalin is signed with record label Cult Nation

Videography

Singles 
 Lubalin, Dougie Jones, 2020 
 Alison Brie, Jimmy Fallon, and Lubalin, Which salad dressing is your favourite?, 2021
 Lubalin, Phoenix (Reprise) (Charlotte Cardin cover), 2022
 Lubalin, long txts, 2021

EPs 

 Lubalin, Whose Love, 2022
 Lubalin, internet drama, 2020

References

External links 
 Official website

Living people
Canadian TikTokers
Musicians from Montreal
2020 in Internet culture
21st-century Canadian male musicians
21st-century Canadian musicians
Year of birth missing (living people)